Shimmin is a surname of Manx origin. The name is derived from the Manx Gaelic McSimeen, meaning "little Simon's son". Early records of the name include, MacSimon in 1366, MacShemine in 1430, and Shimin in 1614.

Shimmin may refer to:

People
Beth Shimmin (born 1987), Australian, a netball player.
Dominic Shimmin (born 1987), English, a footballer.
John Shimmin, former Manx politician.
Christopher R. Shimmin (1870–1933), Manx playwright and MHK.
Thomas Shimmin (1800–1879), Manx, a rag gatherer and poet.
Danny Shimmin, Manx, International Motorcycle racer. Winner of the 1976 Lightweight Manx Grand Prix. Killed in practice for the Manx Grand Prix, 16 August 1997.
 Robin Shimmin (born 1989), founder and CEO of Dojo App and Kyra TV.
Nigel Shimmin (born 1959), Scotts Place Garage, Claughton Village, Birkenhead.

Other
Shimmin, a hall of residence at the University of Leeds.

References

Surnames of Manx origin